Henry Goodricke may refer to:

Sir Henry Goodricke, 2nd Baronet (1642–1705)
Sir Henry Goodricke, 4th Baronet (1677–1738), of the Goodricke baronets
Sir Henry Goodricke, 6th Baronet (1765–1802)
Sir Henry Goodricke, 7th Baronet (1797–1833), of the Goodricke baronets
 Henry Goodricke (1741–1784), MP for Lymington 1778–80